Adam Mójta (born 30 June 1986) is a Polish football defender who plays for ŁKS Łagów.

Club career
On 20 August 2020, he joined III liga club ŁKS Łagów.

References

External links
 
 

Living people
1986 births
Polish footballers
Polish expatriate footballers
People from Jelenia Góra
Sportspeople from Lower Silesian Voivodeship
Miedź Legnica players
Korona Kielce players
Odra Wodzisław Śląski players
FK Viktoria Žižkov players
Zagłębie Sosnowiec players
Warta Poznań players
Sandecja Nowy Sącz players
GKS Bełchatów players
Podbeskidzie Bielsko-Biała players
Wisła Kraków players
Piast Gliwice players
MKP Pogoń Siedlce players
Ekstraklasa players
I liga players
II liga players
III liga players
Czech National Football League players
Polish expatriate sportspeople in the Czech Republic
Expatriate footballers in the Czech Republic
Association football defenders